Paul Vautin (born 21 July 1959) nicknamed Fatty, is an Australian football commentator and formerly a professional rugby league footballer, captain and coach. He has provided commentary for the Nine Network's coverage of rugby league since joining the network in 1992 and also hosted The Footy Show from its beginnings in 1994 opposite co-host Peter Sterling, until 2017. An Australian Kangaroos test and Queensland State of Origin representative lock or second-row forward, Vautin played club football in Brisbane with Wests, before moving to Sydney in 1979 to play with Manly-Warringah, whom he would captain to the 1987 NSWRL premiership. He also played for Sydney's Eastern Suburbs, and in England for St Helens.

After playing, Vautin became a sports commentator for the Nine Network, calling rugby league games alongside Ray Warren and the recently retired Peter Sterling. Later, during the Super League war, he was hired to coach Queensland in the 1995 State of Origin series and took the Maroons to an upset 3–0 whitewash of series favourite New South Wales.

According to Vautin, he earned his nickname "Fatty" soon after joining Manly in 1979. While being shown around Brookvale Oval by club secretary Ken Arthurson, he walked past retired Manly premiership captain Fred Jones who was in conversation with club and Kangaroos fullback Graham Eadie. Jones asked Eadie "Who is that fatty?", and the name stuck.

Playing career
Vautin made his name in the late 1970s. He played for the Wests Panthers in the Brisbane Rugby League premiership, the Manly-Warringah Sea Eagles in Sydney, St. Helens in England, Queensland in the State of Origin and the Australia national rugby league team. He finished his playing career with Sydney club the Eastern Suburbs Roosters in 1991.

Club

Wests Panthers
Vautin was signed by Manly-Warringah club Secretary Ken Arthurson in late 1978 after Arthurson had viewed a tape of him scoring a 75-metre try from a scrum for Wests at Lang Park, and moved from Brisbane to play for the defending NSWRFL premiers starting in 1979.

Manly-Warringah Sea Eagles
After playing Reserve Grade for Manly in the opening round of the 1979 season, against St. George at Kogarah Oval, Vautin went on to play in grand finals with Manly in 1982 and 1983, going down to Parramatta both times.

Vautin was named captain of Manly-Warringah in 1985 by coach Bob Fulton.

Vautin enjoyed success in leading Manly to an 18–8 victory over the Canberra Raiders in the 1987 Grand Final, the last played at the Sydney Cricket Ground. Before the 1987 season had started, the Manly club board had wanted Bob Fulton to install 1986 Kangaroo tour second rower Noel Cleal as club captain , replacing Vautin who had captained the side since 1985.

Following the grand final victory in 1987, he traveled with Manly to England for the 1987 World Club Challenge against their champions, Wigan. The home side won a try-less game 8–2 at Central Park. During the match, Vautin was tackled over the sideline in front of the main grandstand. After easily being the best side in the Sydney competition during the year, and after the unbeaten 1986 Kangaroo tour of Great Britain and France, the Manly players later admitted to over-confidence and took the game far too lightly, treating the trip more as a holiday than anything serious and actually continued their grand final celebrations while in England.

St. Helens
Vautin and Manly teammate Michael O'Connor both signed to play for the Alex Murphy coached St. Helens during the 1988–89 Rugby Football League season on 2 August 1988. Fatty would go on to captain St. Helens in his last match for them, a 27–0 loss to Wigan in the 1989 Challenge Cup Final played on 29 April 1989 at Wembley Stadium in front of 78,000 fans. It was the first time since 1952 that a team had been held scoreless. Vautin played 21 games for St. Helens in 1988–89 and made his début in English club football on 9 October 1988 in a 30–22 win over Hull Kingston Rovers at Craven Park in Hull.

Eastern Suburbs Roosters
He signed with the Eastern Suburbs Roosters for two years, where he even spent time in reserve grade after being dropped by coach Mark Murray - a former Queensland and Australian teammate, before retiring at the end of the 1991 NSWRL season. His last game for the out of contention Roosters was an 8-42 loss to eventual premiers Penrith at the Sydney Football Stadium on 25 August, the final round of the season.

State of Origin

Vautin made his Origin début for the Maroons in game 2 of the 1982 series. He was originally selected as the starting lock forward but was moved to the bench on the day of the game  by coach Arthur Beetson in favor of Rod Morris who ended up putting in a man of the match performance. Vautin came on in the second half and, with Queensland leading 8–7, scored the winning try for the Maroons that kept the series alive after New South Wales had won game 1. Queensland went on to win game 3 of the series at the SCG where Vautin again started from the bench.

In 1984, Vautin and Manly teammate Chris Close became the last Queensland representative players to be selected for the annual NSW City vs NSW Country game, when he was selected in the second row for NSW City for the game at the SCG, won 38–12 by City.

For the next nine years, with the exception of 1986 when he was not considered for selection due to his broken arm, he was a regular in those star-studded Queensland sides which included test captains Wally Lewis and Mal Meninga, as well as Gene Miles, Gary Belcher, Bob Lindner, Greg Dowling and Allan Langer, and Manly teammates Chris Close, Dale Shearer, John Ribot and Kerry Boustead, and produced many inspirational performances over 22 games. He had the honor of captaining the Queensland side in the first game of the 1988 State of Origin series at the new Sydney Football Stadium, and the first game of the 1990 series at Olympic Park in Melbourne - the first Origin game in Australia played outside of Brisbane or Sydney. Both times he captained the team was when Lewis was ruled out with injury. At the time he became only the third Queensland Origin captain at the time alongside Beetson and Lewis.

Game 1 of the 1990 series was Vautin's last game of State of Origin football as he was dumped after Queensland lost 0–8 to NSW after having won both the previous two series 3–0.

International

Vautin made his test début for Australia in 1982 in the first test against New Zealand, at Lang Park in Brisbane under the coaching of his original Manly coach Frank Stanton. However, after playing for Queensland and Australia, and helping Manly to second on the ladder and then into the grand final against minor premiers Parramatta, he was not selected for the end of season 1982 Kangaroo tour.

He returned to the test team for Australia's mid-season tour to New Zealand in 1983, and in 1984 was selected for the second Ashes Test against Great Britain at Lang Park, copping an elbow to the face from replacement Mick Adams as he tackled the Lions forward, resulting in a fractured cheekbone during the 18–6 win which saw Australia retain The Ashes. Vautin's injury kept him out of the third test at the Sydney Cricket Ground, and caused him to miss 11 games of the 1984 NSWRL season.

Vautin played 13 test matches during his career, touring New Zealand twice in 1985 and 1989. In addition to the thirteen tests he played for Australia, he played two tour games in New Zealand in 1985 and three tour games in 1989.

Vautin was selected for Australia in their successful 1988 Ashes series against the Great Britain tourists. As a result of being selected for the first test, Vautin missed playing in Manly's 30–0 demolition of Great Britain at Brookvale Oval only four days before the first test. 

Vautin was the vice-captain of Australia's mid-season tour of New Zealand in 1989, captaining the team in three tour games (Wally Lewis was the tour and test captain). Fatty captained the Australian team (now coached by Bob Fulton) to a 50–18 win over a New Zealand XIII at the Palmerston North Showgrounds in the opening game of the tour.

During his career, Vautin often had to compete with players such as Ray Price, Wayne Pearce and fellow Queenslander Bob Lindner for the Australian Lock-forward position, and as such was often selected in the second row. Of his 13 test matches, Vautin played 8 in the second row, 4 at lock and one (a 70–8 win over Papua New Guinea in Wagga Wagga in 1988) from the bench.

Coaching career
Loyal to his Channel Nine employer, Vautin was a vocal supporter of the Kerry Packer-backed Australian Rugby League during the Super League war which started in 1995. With only limited coaching experience having coached the Brisbane Capitols to the Winfield State League championship in 1992 (winning all 5 games), he was considered an inferior replacement for dual premiership winning coach Wayne Bennett who was originally named to return as coach of the 1995 Queensland State of Origin team (Bennett had previously coached the Maroons from 1986-1988), and with Queensland having lost the last three consecutive series and being given a handful of young and inexperienced players, Vautin and Queensland were expected to be easy prey for NSW, who could still boast almost half a side of international players as well as Origin and dual premiership winning coach Phil Gould. However, his representative coaching début took a fairy tale turn when the young Maroons, without any of the stars from Super League-aligned clubs (most notably the Wayne Bennett coached Brisbane Broncos), completed a 3–0 series whitewash of New South Wales that year.

With the Super League players available for selection in the 1996 State of Origin series, Queensland were rated a chance of retaining their crown but lost the series 0–3. After losing the 1997 series 1–2, Vautin was replaced as Queensland coach the following year by Wayne Bennett.

Post-football career
In 2000, Vautin was awarded the Australian Sports Medal for his contribution to Australia's international standing in the sport of rugby league.

Commentary
After Manly had been knocked out of the finals series, Paul Vautin made his television commentary début during the 1988 NSWRL Grand Final with the ABC alongside long time caller David Morrow. Vautin's introduction to television commentary did not go to plan though as he thought they were pre-recording the introduction to the game and dropped the "F-bomb", only to find out that it was in fact being broadcast live around Australia.

Vautin was then signed by the Nine Network and has been a regular commentator for Nine's Wide World of Sports' coverage of rugby league matches alongside Ray Warren and Peter Sterling since 1992.

The Footy Show
Vautin has hosted The NRL Footy Show since 1994, propelling him to TV stardom. He suffered a serious concussion in 2005 filming for the show in a segment called "Dare-Devil Dudes", when he hit his head on concrete, with a helmet luckily minimising the damage. He did not host for a period of about 10 weeks.

From 1992 to 2004, he was a mainstay of the Channel Nine match commentary team along with Peter Sterling and Ray Warren, calling club, Origin and international games. Since the concussion incident, he had focussed on his Footy Show appearances but was still part of the broader Nine expert commentary team for big fixtures like the State of Origin.

Speculation existed that 2017 would be Vautin's last season as host of The Footy Show. In October 2017, Vautin was axed from The Footy Show.

References

Sources
Colman, Mike (1992) Fatty: The Strife and Times of Paul Vautin, Ironbark Press, Sydney
Vautin, Paul: Turn It Up! The life and thoughts of Paul "Fatty" Vautin; Pan Publishing, Sydney, 1995. A collection of articles Vautin has written between late 1993 (including his appearance and well-publicised catch in an all-stars cricket match in Queensland) and the end of 1993, covering some of his past and views on current events of the time.
Andrews, Malcolm (2006) The ABC of Rugby League, Austn Broadcasting Corpn, Sydney
Big League, State of Origin 25 Years Collectors Edition 1980–2005, News Magazines, Sydney

External links

Saints.org
Paul Vautin at Silvertails.net

1959 births
Living people
Australia national rugby league team players
Australian rugby league coaches
Australian rugby league commentators
Australian rugby league players
Australian television presenters
Manly Warringah Sea Eagles captains
Manly Warringah Sea Eagles players
Nine's Wide World of Sport
People educated at Padua College (Brisbane)
Queensland Rugby League State of Origin captains
Queensland Rugby League State of Origin coaches
Queensland Rugby League State of Origin players
Recipients of the Australian Sports Medal
Rugby league locks
Rugby league players from Brisbane
Rugby league second-rows
St Helens R.F.C. captains
St Helens R.F.C. players
Sydney Roosters players
Wests Panthers players